In the Eye of the Storm is the first solo album by former Supertramp member Roger Hodgson. Some of its songs (e.g. "Hooked on a Problem" and "Only Because of You") were initially written and recorded for Supertramp's previous album ...Famous Last Words..., but not released.

Overview
The album's first single was the four-minute edit of "Had a Dream (Sleeping with the Enemy)", which peaked at number 48 on the Billboard Hot 100. The follow-up single, a four-minute edit of "In Jeopardy", was a minor hit, peaking at number 30 on the Mainstream Rock Tracks chart but failing to crack the Billboard Hot 100. The album itself was only moderately successful, stalling at number 46 on the Billboard album chart and only reaching number 70 on the UK Albums Chart. It performed far better in Canada, going platinum within a month of its release. It also enjoyed success in Australia, hitting number 23 on the album charts as "Had a Dream (Sleeping with the Enemy)" peaked at number 21. "Lovers in the Wind" became a hit in the Philippines.

A sticker affixed to the cover cellophane of the album name-dropped both the album's two singles and "Hooked on a Problem", indicating that "Hooked" may have been intended for a single release at some point.

Reception

The album received a positive review from AllMusic, who stated that the album's key quality is that Hodgson plays the vast majority of the instruments himself. They also noted that though the music itself lacks any progressive rock elements, "The spirit of traditional progressive rock experimentation is alive on this album; five of the seven songs exceed six minutes."

Track listing 
All songs written and arranged by Roger Hodgson.

"Had a Dream (Sleeping with the Enemy)" (8:27)
"In Jeopardy" (5:59)
"Lovers in the Wind" (4:11)
"Hooked on a Problem" (5:10)
"Give Me Love, Give Me Life" (7:33)
"I'm Not Afraid" (7:03)
"Only Because of You" (8:40)

Personnel
Roger Hodgson - guitars, keyboards, bass, drums, lead and backing vocals
Michael Shrieve - drums (tracks 1, 2, 5-7)
Ken Allardyce - harmonica (track 6), additional vocals (tracks 2, 3, 5)
Jimmy Johnson - fretless bass (tracks 3, 7)
Claire Diament - vocals (track 7)
Scott Page - saxophone (track 4)

Production

Written, arranged and produced by Roger Hodgson
Recorded at Unicorn Studios, Nevada City, California.
Recording engineers: Scott Litt & James Farber
Assistant recording engineer: Ken Allardyce
Technical assistance: Chris Amson
Mixed at Power Station, New York
Mixing engineer: James Farber
Assistant mixing engineers: Ken Allardyce & Malcolm Pollack
Mastered at Masterdisk, New York
Mastering: Howie Weinberg
Digitally remastered by Andrew Garver at A&M Mastering Studios, Hollywood, CA.
Special thanks to Yamaha and Skip's Music, Sacramento
Roger Hodgson represented by Doug Pringle

The following inscription is printed inside the CD booklet:

I'd like to thank all those who weathered the storm with me, especially Doug Pringle and Ken Allardyce, for their musical and moral support.''

Charts
Album – Billboard (United States)

References

1984 debut albums
Roger Hodgson albums
A&M Records albums
Albums produced by Roger Hodgson
Albums recorded in a home studio